F. floribunda may refer to:

 Fagraea floribunda, a plant with flowers that open in the evening
 Fraxinus floribunda, an ash native to the Himalayas